Canteleu is a commune in the Seine-Maritime department in the Normandy region in north-western France.

Geography

Heraldry

Population

Places of interest
 Saint-Martin's church, dating from the thirteenth century.
 The seventeenth century convent of Sainte-Barbe, built over a cave in the cliffs, overlooking the river.
 The Flaubert museum.
 The two churches of St. Pierre, at the hamlets of Bapeaume (1872) and Croisset.
 Vestiges of a 12th-century castle at Croisset.
 A Carthaginian column in the park.
 The sixteenth century Château des Deux-Lions.
 A turretted house at Dieppedalle.

Notable people
 Gustave Flaubert (1821–1880) lived at the hamlet of Croisset for 40 years and died here.
 English painter Robert Henry Cheney (1801–1866) painted several views of and from here, including the watercolour Rouen-From the chateau de Cantelieu, July 19, 1842.

Twin towns
 Buchholz in der Nordheide, Germany
 Wolow, Poland
 New Milton, England
 Kongoussi, Burkina Faso

See also
Communes of the Seine-Maritime department

References

Bibliography
Alice Lejard, Canteleu aux multiples facettes, 2000 
Michel Giard, Hurler avec les loups à Canteleu, Éd. Charles Corlet, 2003

External links

Official town website 

Communes of Seine-Maritime